The Cali Philharmonic Orchestra in Spanish Orquesta Filarmónica de Cali (OFC), is a Colombian orchestra based in based in Cali, Valle del Cauca, Colombia. It is the only professional orchestra in the southwest of Colombia and the smallest in the country, considered one of the oldest symphonic groups with a long history of more than 80 years and one of the most prestigious symphonic groups together with the National Symphonic Orchestra of Colombia and the Philharmonic Orchestra of Medellín.

History

Principal conductors 

 Antonio María Valencia 
 León J. Simar 
 Luis Carlos Figeroa Sierra 
 Gustavo Yepes 
 Agustin Cullell 
 Dimitri Manolov 
 François Dolmetsch 
 Paul Dury
 Ricardo Jaramillo 
 Eduardo Carrizosa 
 Irwin Hoffman
 Adrián Chamorro 
 Jorge Mario Uribe
 Francesco Belli

Tours

See also
Since February 2012, the Orchestra is being directed by Irwin Hoffman.
 List of symphony orchestras

Notes

References

External links
 Cali Philharmonic Orchestra official site 

University of Valle
Colombian orchestras
Musical groups established in 2002
Colombian culture
2002 establishments in Colombia